Aristolochia delavayi, known as the party-colored birthwort, is a species of flowering plant in the family Aristolochiaceae.

Description
Perennial. Stems striate, prostrate or ascending. Leaves petiolate, broadly cordate at base; limb triangular. Flowers reaching up to 10 cm long; peduncle bending towards the two-thirds. Ovary striate. pubescent. Tube recurved. Strip very dilated, with two cordate and very developed auricles. Outer. part greenish or reddish, puberulent. Inner part glabrous; background brightmyellow overcharged with blackish purple spots.

Flowering
The plant flowers in April–May.

Habitat
More or less rocky places, rather shady.

Distribution
Lower and middle mountains, Hermon.

Geographic area
It is endemic to Syria, Lebanon and Palestine.

The spots on the bright yellow background of the large flowers of this birthwort are at the origin of its specific name which comes from the Greek poikilos, spotted, and anthos, flower.

References

Georges Tohme& Henriette Tohme, IIIustrated Flora of Lebanon, National Council For Scientific Research, Second Edition 2014.

Flora of Lebanon and Syria
paecilantha
Taxa named by Pierre Edmond Boissier